The Kentish Express is a weekly newspaper serving southern Kent. It is published in four editions - Ashford, Folkestone, Hythe and the Romney Marsh, and Tenterden. It is owned by the KM Group and is published on Thursdays.

History
The Kentish Express was founded in 1855 as the Ashford and Alfred News. The first edition was published on 14 July 1855. The paper was Kent's first penny paper after the abolition of stamp duty on newspapers in 1854. Three years later, the paper was renamed the Kentish Express & Ashford News.

The KM Group bought the Express in 1971. It also purchased the Folkestone Express, which was renamed the Kentish Express (Folkestone) in 2008.

Along with the rest of the KM-owned papers, the Express was given a design overhaul in May 2005.

Offices
All four editions of the Kentish Express are based at the KM Group's Ashford offices. The Folkestone and Hythe editions were based at the Folkestone offices until April 2009, when the offices were closed.

Circulation
The combined circulation of the four papers in the first half of 2009 was 18,664, a drop of 12.4% against the same period in 2008.

References

External links
 Kentish Express homepage

KM Group newspapers
Newspapers published in Kent
Newspapers established in 1855
Borough of Ashford
Folkestone and Hythe District
Weekly newspapers published in the United Kingdom
1855 establishments in England